Pharasmanes II the Valiant or the Brave was a king of Iberia (Kartli) from the Pharnavazid dynasty, contemporary of the Roman emperor Hadrian (r. 117–138). Professor Cyril Toumanoff suggests AD 116–132 as the years of Pharasmanes’ reign. He features in several Classical accounts.

Life

The medieval Georgian annals report Pharasmanes' joint rule with Pharasmanes Avaz, diarchs (one source has the extra pair: Rok and Mihrdat), but several modern scholars consider the Iberian diarchy unlikely as it is not corroborated by the contemporary evidence. Pharasmanes is reported to have been the son of his predecessor, King Amazasp I. He is said to have married Ghadana, daughter of King Vologases III of Parthia who ruled in Armenia. According to the medieval Life of Kings, the traditional friendship of the two dyarchs soured at the instigation of the Iranian wife of Mihrdat. Toumanoff regards this information a back-projection of the historically recorded enmity of Pharasmanes I of Iberia and his brother Mithridates of Armenia. The chronicle then continues a story of an Armenian-Roman alliance and their invasion of the Iranian-backed Iberia in which Pharasmanes finds his death.

Reign

The Georgian royal annals describe Pharasmanes in the following way:

The contemporary Classical authors, with more solid historical background, focus on Pharasmanes’ uneasy relations with Rome. He refused in 129 to come and pay homage to the emperor Hadrian.

According to the Aelius Spartianus, one of the authors of Augustan History:

Pharasmanes then went touring the East, and prompted the Alans to attack the neighboring Roman provinces by giving them a passage through his realm, even though the emperor had sent him greater gifts including a war elephant, than to any other king of the East. In his pique, Hadrian dressed some 300 criminals in the gold-embroidered cloaks which were part of the return gift of Pharasmanes, and sent them into the arena.

According to Spartianus:

Eventually, the ancient sources report a highly honored visit paid by Pharasmanes to Hadrian's successor Antoninus Pius. According to Cassius Dio, he came to Rome as guest of Antoninus Pius, together with his wife, son, and noble retinue where he was especially honored, being allowed to sacrifice in the Capitol and to have his equestrian statue in the temple of Bellona, and also the emperor increased the territory of his kingdom. This Pharasmanes, however, might have been Pharasmanes III, Pharasmanes II's possible grandson.  This visit was recorded on a fragment of the Fasti Ostienses.

According to the Georgian royal annals King Pharasmanes was poisoned by the chef sent by the Parthians.

References

Pharnavazid kings of Iberia
2nd-century monarchs in Asia
Deaths by poisoning
Assassinated royalty
Assassinated heads of state
Deaths from food poisoning